Lampman/Spitfire Air Aerodrome  is located  north-west of Lampman, Saskatchewan, Canada.

See also 
Lampman Airport
List of airports in Saskatchewan

References 

Registered aerodromes in Saskatchewan
Browning No. 34, Saskatchewan